Ellis Spring is a spring in Catoosa County, Georgia, in the United States.

Ellis Spring was named for a local family who settled near this stream.

References

Bodies of water of Catoosa County, Georgia
Springs of Georgia (U.S. state)